Henstridge is a village and civil parish in Somerset, England. It may also refer to:

People
Natasha Henstridge (born 1974), Canadian actress and fashion model
Elizabeth Henstridge (born 1987), English actress

See also
The Royals (TV series)